The night of churches or The long night of churches is an annual religious and cultural festival, organized by various Christian Churches. The main idea is that visitors can see sights (churches or chapels) without obligation and for free, and meet believers among many denominations.

History

In Germany 
The first long night of churches took place in Germany (Frankfurt and Hannover) in 2003. Since then it has been organized every year and expanded to more and more cities. Three years later there were 70 churches open in Hannover, receiving about 47,000 visitors.

In other countries 
In 2005 the long night of churches took place in Vienna, Austria. Four years later the Diocese of Brno in the Czech Republic joined. In the following years the event has expanded to more European countries.

See also 
 
Christian culture
Christian evangelism

References

External links 

 Lange Nacht der Kirchen - Austria
 Noc kostolov - Slovakia
 Noc kostelů - Czech Republic
 Kirikute Öö - Estonia

Christian festivals
Church buildings